The Grand Etang and Annandale Forest Reserves are contiguous protected areas located in the south central interior mountains of Grenada. Together they encompass the largest declared terrestrial protected area in Grenada followed by the Mount St. Catherine Forest Reserve. The Grand Etang and Annandale Forest Reserves are managed together.

References

Forest reserves
Forests
Protected areas of the Caribbean
Geography of Grenada